Julio César Chávez Carrasco (born 16 February 1986), best known as Julio César Chávez Jr., is a Mexican professional boxer who held the WBC middleweight title from 2011 to 2012. He is the son of former three-division world champion of boxing, Julio César Chávez, and older brother of Omar Chávez.

Personal life 
Chávez Jr. was born in the state of Sinaloa, when his father held the WBC World Championship at super featherweight. His face became known to boxing fans when his father would take him and his brother Omar into the ring as children, before each of Chávez Sr.'s fights. As a teenager, Chávez Jr. endured some difficult moments, including a widely publicized relationship between his father and actress Salma Hayek and the subsequent divorce of his parents. Chávez Jr. lived in relative obscurity until he announced that he would follow in the footsteps of his father and become a boxer.

Amateur career 
Chávez's amateur career consisted of only two fights against former world champion Jorge Páez's oldest son Jorge Páez Jr.; both of the exhibitions bouts were shown on Mexican television.

Professional career

Early career 
After those amateur fights, Chávez Jr. started his professional boxing career at 17 years old. On 26 September 2003, at Super Featherweight (130 lbs), he won his professional debut by outpointing Jonathan Hernandez over six rounds in Chávez Jr.'s native Culiacán, Sinaloa. Chávez Jr. was signed with Bob Arum's Top Rank. Many of his fights have been held during boxing programs that have been headed by his father; he has also been featured on the undercards of many major pay-per-view fights (rare for an up-and-coming fighter, but not unexpected in his case given his father's fame). He is considerably taller than his father. Chávez Jr. set a fighting pace that was reminiscent of Chávez Sr.'s own pace when the latter was a younger man: in 2004, he fought eleven times, not having a fight only in August during that year.

Chávez won by a split decision over Matt Vanda 12 July 2008. Scores for the fight were 97–93 and 100–90, while losing 96–95 on another card. Chávez struggled with making weight for several bouts and was suspended following his win over Troy Rowland for using a banned diuretic, furosemide, to make the 160-pound weight limit. As a result, the fight was changed to a no contest.

Middleweight 
On 26 June 2010, at the Alamodome in San Antonio, Chávez Jr. had a win against John Duddy, in what many regard as his first serious fight.

In December 2010, Alfonso Gómez was signed to match up against the undefeated Chávez Jr. at middleweight (the contracted weight was 157) for Chávez Jr.'s WBC Silver Middleweight belt on the In Harm's Way card as the main event. However, during training for the bout, Alfonso tore some ligaments in his left elbow and had to withdraw from the card and undergo a few months of rehab. For his part, Chávez Jr. was set to fight Paweł Wolak as a replacement bout, but after adjusting the weight limit for said match to 165 lbs, Chávez Jr. had to pull out due to the flu messing up his training and weight loss and then in January he went on to beat title contender Billy Lyell.

Chávez Jr. vs. Zbik 

On 4 June 2011, Chávez defeated WBC Middleweight Champion Sebastian Zbik to win his first world title at the Staples Center in Los Angeles, California, taking a major step toward establishing his own legacy while his famous father looked on. He was behind early against Zbik, who was the quicker fighter and landed more punches early. But Chávez kept coming forward, countering with hard body shots that seemed to slow his German opponent down. The fight drew 1.5 million viewers on HBO: Boxing After Dark making it the most viewed since 2007 when Paulie Malignaggi fought Lovemore Ndou.

Chávez Jr. vs. Manfredo Jr. 

Chávez Jr. successfully defended his Middleweight title with a fifth-round knockout of Peter Manfredo Jr. in Houston on 19 November 2011.

Chávez was marginally outworked, but he landed a higher percentage of punches and more power shots than Manfredo. In the fifth round, Chávez hurt Manfredo with a hard right hand and unloaded a flurry when the challenger wobbled and backed up on the ropes. He didn't answer with any punches and referee Laurence Cole finally stepped in to call it at 1 minutes, 52 seconds. The fight averaged 1.5 million viewers on HBO.

Chávez Jr. vs. Rubio 

On 4 February 2012, at the Alamodome in San Antonio, Texas, Chávez faced Mexican countryman Marco Antonio Rubio in a 12-round scheduled championship Middleweight bout. Chávez Jr. retained his WBC Middleweight title after beating Rubio by a unanimous decision. Chávez bossed the majority of the exchanges and was awarded the fight 118-110 116-112 115–113 on the judges' scorecards. Chavez landed 237 of 560 punches thrown (42%) whilst Rubio connected 201 of 962 punches (21%). The fight was watched by 19 million viewers in Mexico. In the US, the fight was shown live on HBO: Boxing After Dark and averaged 1.9 million viewers.

Two weeks before the fight, Chávez was arrested in Los Angeles on charges of drunk driving.

Chávez Jr. vs. Lee 
On 16 June 2012, at the University of Texas at El Paso, Sunbowl in El Paso, Texas. Chávez Jr. recovered from a slow start he blamed on leg cramps and stopped Andy Lee at 2:21 of the seventh round to retain the WBC Middleweight title. A right uppercut by Chávez snapped Lee's head upwards and sideways and Chávez connected on a barrage of punches before referee Laurence Cole intervened and waved an end to the fight. The fight averaged 1.6 million viewers on HBO.

With the victory, Chávez put himself in position for a title-unification fight with recognized World Middleweight Champion Sergio Martinez.

Chávez Jr. vs. Martínez 
A deal was reached for Chávez and Sergio Martínez (49-2-2, 28 KO) to fight on 15 September 2012, at the Thomas & Mack Center in Las Vegas for the Unified WBC and The Ring Middleweight Championship.

Martínez outworked and out-landed Chávez throughout the first 11 rounds of the fight in dominating fashion. Though Chávez had his moments, trapping Martínez in the corner on the ropes, Martínez fought Chávez and used his fast lateral movement to avoid and neutralize Chávez's offensive attack. After 11 dominant rounds from Martinez, Chávez hurt Martínez in the twelfth round, sending him to the canvas halfway through the round. Martínez got up with a little over one minute left in the fight and continued to throw and trade with the Mexican champion, despite being fatigued and clearly hurt. Martínez managed to survive the 12th round. Martínez won the fight by unanimous decision, by the scores of 117–110, 118–109 and 118–109. It was later revealed that Martinez had fought with a broken left hand since the fourth round. A total of 16,939 tickets were sold to generate a live gate of $3,052,475. HBO reported the fight generated 475,000 pay-per-view buys and close to $25 million in revenue. Chávez Jr. received a purse of $3 million, compared to Martinez's $1.4m.

After the fight, Chávez tested positive for cannabis. On 28 February 2013, the Nevada State Athletic Commission suspended him for nine months and fined him $900,000. Chávez had been already fined $20,000 and suspended indefinitely by the World Boxing Council.

Light heavyweight

Chávez Jr. vs. Vera I 
After a year of suspension, Chávez faced Brian Vera on 28 September 2013 at the StubHub Center in Carson, California. Chávez struggled with the weight before the fight weighed in at 172 pounds for a fight contracted in 168 pounds. The night of the fight he weighed 186 pounds. Like the fight against Martínez, Chávez threw very few power punches while Vera dominated the fight. In the late rounds,  although Chávez landed the harder punches throughout the fight. Chávez won a controversial unanimous decision. He threw 320 punches, while Vera threw 734. The decision was heavily criticized by the audience. After the fight, Chávez stated that he fought with an injured hand.

Super-middleweight

Chávez Jr. vs. Vera  II 
A rematch was held on 1 March 2014, at the Alamodome of San Antonio, Texas. Contrary to what happened in the first fight, Chávez came out more aggressive and proposed the fight. He kept the distance with the jab and landed power punches. In the eleventh round he landed a powerful right hand that nearly knocked Vera out. Chávez won via unanimous decision claiming the vacant WBC Continental Americas super middleweight title.

Return to light heavyweight

Chávez Jr. vs. Fonfara 
After a long break from boxing, Chávez Jr. decided to face Andrzej Fonfara, a bout in which Chávez was dominated and dropped by a left hook to the forehead in the 9th round. The fight took place on 18 April 2015 at the StubHub Center, Carson, California. Before the 10th round begun Chávez told his corner "Stop the fight" making it his first TKO in his career. After fight Chávez said "Yes, I think I won the fight". Some words were lost in translation; he meant to say he felt he was winning the fight at early stages of the bout. Chávez was behind in all three judges score cards at the time of the stoppage.

Catchweight fights

Chávez Jr. vs. Reyes 
Chávez announced that he would be returning on 18 July 2015 against fellow Mexican Marcos Reyes (33-2, 24 KOs) at the Don Haskins Convention Center in El Paso, Texas in a 10-round super-middleweight bout. Due to Chávez not making weight the fight time, a catchweight of 170 pounds was established. Chávez was fighting for the first time with renowned trainer Robert Garcia. Chávez won a unanimous decision over Reyes with scores off 97–92, 98–91, 96–93. Reyes started each round with more activity and by landing shots. However, Chávez landed three or four heavy shots that moved Reyes' entire body. The punches seemed to  stun Reyes and gave Chávez control of the rounds. The pro Chávez crowd began to jeer his performance during and after the fight.

Chávez Jr. vs. Britsch 
In October 2016, it was announced that Chávez Jr. would be making a return on 10 December 2016 at the Monterrey Arena in Mexico against German boxer Dominik Britsch (32-2-1, 11 KOs). A catchweight of 169 pounds was agreed by both fighters. Chávez confirmed he would be trained by his uncle, Rodolfo Chávez. With a win here, Chávez Jr. would look to fight Canelo Álvarez next. Chávez Jr. officially weighed in at 168 pounds, the limit for super middleweight.

Chávez Jr. picked up his 50th win of his career after defeating Britsch in a one-sided 10 round unanimous decision in front of a very small crowd in Mexico. All three judges scored it 99–91 in favor of Chávez. In the post fight interview, Chávez called out Canelo and Gennady Golovkin, "I am happy with the win and my performance. I am ready to come back in two or three months. I don't need another fight. I am ready for a world title fight with anybody or any other big fight."

Chávez Jr. vs. Álvarez 

Negotiations began soon after for a potential HBO PPV fight to take place between Chávez and Canelo Álvarez in 2017 on the Cinco de Mayo weekend, as there was interest from both sides that a fight take place. Golden Boy president Eric Gomez confirmed a catchweight of 165 lbs was agreed between both sides. WBC president Mauricio Sulaiman was on board and said it was a "very attractive fight." and would likely get his organization involved in the fight.

Julio César Chávez spoke on 18 December about the ongoing negotiations saying Golden Boy were offering his son a small amount for the potential big PPV fight. He went on to claim his son was offered a $5m purse with no mention he would get a cut of the PPV revenue, a counter offer was submitted. A rematch clause was also discussed, which Chávez Jr. and his team had no problem with. Chávez Sr. went on to admit that he was fully aware Álvarez is the A-side in the fight, and would settle for no less than 30-35% of the full revenue. On 24 December, Álvarez and his team gave Chávez a week to accept  the terms, which included a purse of $7m, or he would consider other options. On 12 January 2017 De La Hoya and Álvarez called for the contract to be signed, which was supposedly sent to Al Haymon, who advises Chávez Jr. and urged him to sign it. A day later, Chávez Jr. claimed he had agreed all the demands set by Álvarez and was said that he would sign the contract. According to Chávez Jr. the new demands included a weight limit set at 164.5 pounds and a $6 million base purse plus PPV revenue percentages.

On 13 January, Álvarez officially confirmed the fight to take place on 6 May 2017. A rematch clause was also put in place if Chávez Jr. wins the fight and another clause for every pound Chávez Jr. weighs over the limit, he would be fined $1 million. On 4 February, Golden Boy Promotions announced that the fight would take place at the T-Mobile Arena in Paradise, Nevada. The fight was announced a sell out on 3 March with 20,000 tickets being sold after they initially went on sale to the public on 20 February.

According to the Nevada State Athletic Commission, it was reported that Álvarez would earn $5 million and Chávez would earn $3 million before any shares of PPV. The figures would increase based on PPV sales.

In front of a sold-out crowd of 20,510, Chávez lost the fight by a shutout unanimous decision. All three judges scored it 120-108 for Álvarez. Chávez was very cautious throughout the fight. At times, he came forward and also had Álvarez against the ropes, but failed to throw any punches. This led to jeers from the crowd in the later rounds due to lack of action. Chávez spoke to HBO's Max Kellerman in the post fight interview, "Speed and distance was a problem. He's a good fighter, very fast and very consistent. Canelo beat me. He beat me at the distance. He is a very active fighter. He's very good, and he beat me." CompuBox Stats showed that Álvarez landed 228 of 604 his punches thrown (38%) and Chávez landed 71 of 302 (24%). By the end of round 5, Álvarez landed 102 punches compared to Chávez's 25 landed. Chávez admitted he should have thrown more, but his corner was telling him to be aware of Álvarez's counter punches. Early figures revealed that the fight generated at least 1 million buys. A replay was shown on regular HBO a week later and drew an average of 769,000 viewers.

This was the first boxing match to generate over 1 million PPV buys that didn't include Mayweather, Pacquiao or De La Hoya since 2002, which saw Lennox Lewis retain his heavyweight world titles against Mike Tyson. Later sources confirmed the fight did close to 1.2 million buys, which means it would have generated around $80 million.

Return to super middleweight 
Following the loss to Alvarez, Chávez Jr. said he would be making a full comeback at 168 pounds in the super middleweight division. He said he would fight again towards the end of 2017, most likely December. A potential name he had mentioned was former WBA 'regular' middleweight champion Daniel Jacobs. On 23 July, Chavez Jr. tweeted that he could return as soon as October 2017 and named Martin Murray (35-4-1,16 KOs) as a potential opponent.

Chavez Jr. on 17 September, announced that he would fight at the full super middleweight limit of 168 pounds against former WBC champion Anthony Dirrell (30-1-1, 24 KOs) at The Forum in Los Angeles, California on 11 November 2017. Three days later, Dirrell spoke out on his local Michigan paper, Mlive, saying "Don't believe that," immediately denying that he had agreed to fight Chavez Jr. On 10 October, trainer Nacho Beristain stated that Chavez would return in December 2017. On 24 October, Beristain revealed that he could not get in touch with Chavez Jr. regarding their training camp. A new date of 16 December was considered for his new return date to the ring. Beristain stated that Chavez was returning to his hold training habits. He told ESPN Deportes that if he did not hear from Chavez in the next 10 days, he would not be working his corner. On 14 November 2017, fellow Mexican Alfredo Angulo (24-6, 20 KOs) was named as a possible opponent as both boxers being advised by Al Haymon. Chavez told ESPN Deportes that he had hoped to reach an agreement with Beristain to work his corner.

A year later, after announcing different return dates which included August 2018, on 14 November, the return of Chavez Jr. was finally announced to take place on 1 December 2018 at the Staples Center in Los Angeles against Alfredo Angulo in a 10-round bout. The fight would take place on the Deontay Wilder vs. Tyson Fury Showtime PPV undercard. Chavez Jr. stated he would campaign at super middleweight and pursue a world title in 2019. On 25 November, there appeared to be some doubt on whether the fight would actually take place. Sources indicated Chavez Jr. had not 'complied with the necessary medical exam requirements' and thus unable to obtain the necessary license. The fight was cancelled a day later as Chávez Sr stated his son was not ready to return.

On 10 August 2019, Chavez finally made his return to the ring after not having boxed for 2 years and 3 months and knocked out unrecognized Colombian Evert Bravo (25-10-1 with 9/10 losses coming by KO) in the 1st round in front of a crowd of 6000 fans at the Antonio R. Márquez Stadium in San Juan de los Lagos, Jalisco.

Chavez was then brought to much controversy, after he was then scheduled to face Daniel Jacobs in Las Vegas. A month before the fight, he did not make weight and was fined and the fight was pushed back to December. On 20 December in Phoenix, Chavez lost to Jacobs via a Round 5 TKO after claiming, "his nose was broken and couldn’t breathe", and also to a broken hand. This sparked outrage due to Chavez "quitting on his terms", resulting in fans throwing trash and beer into the ring and at Chavez Jr., and at major stars such as former heavyweight champion Andy Ruiz Jr., the middleweight champion Canelo Alvarez and even Chávez' father. July 2020 he gets an indefinite suspension for failing to provide a drug test in December 2019 fight.

Light heavyweight

Chavez Jr vs. Cazares 
He was scheduled to face Mario Abel Cazares on 25 September 2020, with the bout serving as part of the undercard for an exhibition match between Chávez' father and former four-weight world champion Jorge Arce. Chavez lost the fight via technical decision, after he was pulled out of the fight in the sixth round, due to a bad cut from an alleged headbutt from Cazares.

Chavez Jr vs. Minda 
In his next fight, on 27 November 2020, Chávez Jr faced Jeyson Minda. Chávez Jr dropped Minda in the second, third and fourth round. The last knockdown prompted Minda's corner to stop the fight early, and earn Chávez Jr a TKO win.

Chavez Jr vs. Silva 

In March 2021, it was announced that Chávez Jr would face former UFC Middleweight Champion Anderson Silva on 19 June 2021. Chávez Jr missed the contractual weight of 182 lbs. after weighing in at 184.4 lbs. and forfeited $100,000 of his purse to Silva. Chavez Jr lost the fight via split decision, being outstruck throughout the fight.

Professional boxing record

Pay per view bouts

Trainers 
Chávez has been trained by two of his uncles, who have been criticized for not putting their foot down with the young fighter in terms of discipline. Chávez needed more motivation and guidance so he switched from his uncles to famous Freddie Roach to his corner.

On 3 February, Chávez Jr. revealed that he had hired hall of fame trainer Ignacio "Nacho Beristain" for the Álvarez fight. Beristain later confirmed the announcement. He also revealed he had hired Angel "Memo" Heredia as his strength and conditioning coach. Nacho and Heredia previously worked together whilst training Juan Manuel Marquez. In early April, Nacho threatened to split with Chávez Jr. during a verbal clash. Nacho revealed that Chávez Jr. wanted to finish up training camp and travel to Mexico City or Las Vegas to finish up before the fight. Nacho wanted Chávez Jr. to remain in Temoaya, Mexico, which is 3,200 meters above sea level, until the end of April. Nacho said that he wanted to remain his trainer after 6 May.

See also 
List of Mexican boxing world champions
Notable boxing families
List of WBC world champions
List of middleweight boxing champions

References

External links 

Julio Cesar Chavez Jr - Profile, News Archive & Current Rankings at Box.Live

Boxers from Sinaloa
Sportspeople from Culiacán
World boxing champions
World middleweight boxing champions
World Boxing Council champions
Light-middleweight boxers
Super-middleweight boxers
Light-heavyweight boxers
Doping cases in boxing
1986 births
Living people
Mexican male boxers